Bernard Joseph Baron (born June 26, 1955 in Richmond, Virginia) is an American avant-garde jazz drummer who plays frequently with Bill Frisell and John Zorn.

Music career
Baron was born on June 26, 1955, in Richmond Virginia. When he was nine, he taught himself how to play the drums. As a teenager, he played in rock bands and dixieland jazz groups and was given his first gig opportunity at the age of 13 when pianist BJ Doyle's regular drummer took ill and she knew he was a keeper after just minutes. After high school, he spent a year at the Berklee College of Music. He moved to Los Angeles in the early 1970s and embarked on a professional career, playing with Carmen McRae and Al Jarreau. He worked as a freelance drummer and session musician with Chet Baker, Stan Getz, Dizzy Gillespie, and Hampton Hawes.

In 1982 he moved to New York City and joined guitarist Bill Frisell, with whom he would play often throughout his career. He also played in groups with Red Rodney, Fred Hersch, Enrico Pieranunzi, and Marc Johnson. Starting in the late 1980s, he became a bigger part of the avant-garde jazz scene when he played regularly at the Knitting Factory, recorded with singer Laurie Anderson, and began a long association with John Zorn. For several years he participated in Zorn's projects Naked City and Masada.

Baron contributed to David Bowie's Outside (1995). Bowie would later praise Baron, stating: "Metronomes shake in fear, he's so steady."

Discography

As leader/co-leader
 Tongue in Groove (JMT, 1992)
 RAIsedpleasuredot (New World, 1993)
 Crackshot (Avant, 1995)
 Down Home (Intuition, 1997)
 We'll Soon Find Out (Intuition, 1999)
 Killer Joey (Goo-Head, 2000)
 Beyond (Auditorium, 2001)
 Venice, Dal Vivo (D'Autres Cordes, 2010)
 Just Listen (Relative Pitch, 2013)
 Live! (Intakt, 2017) with Irène Schweizer
 Now You Hear Me (Intakt, 2018) with Robyn Schulkowsky

As sideman
With John Abercrombie
 Cat 'n' Mouse (ECM, 2000)
 Class Trip (ECM, 2003)
 The Third Quartet (ECM, 2006)
 Wait Till You See Her (ECM, 2008)
 Within a Song (ECM, 2012)
 39 Steps (ECM, 2013)
 Up and Coming (ECM, 2017)
With the Toshiko Akiyoshi
 Tuttie Flutie (Discomate, 1980)
 European Memoirs (Victor, 1982)
 Toshiko Akiyoshi Trio (Eastworld, 1983)
With Laurie Anderson
 Strange Angels (Warner Bros., 1989)
 Bright Red (Warner Bros., 1994)
 The Ugly One with the Jewels (Warner Bros., 1995)
 Life on a String (Elektra Nonesuch, 2001)
With Tim Berne
 Miniature (JMT, 1988)
 Tim Berne's Fractured Fairy Tales (JMT, 1989)
 I Can't Put My Finger on It (JMT, 1991)
 Diminutive Mysteries (Mostly Hemphill) (JMT, 1993)
With David Bowie
 Outside (Arista/BMG, 1995)
With Jakob Bro
 Streams (ECM, 2016)
With Uri Caine
 Urlicht / Primal Light (Winter & Winter, 1997)
With James Carter
 Chasin' the Gypsy (Atlantic, 2000)
 Heaven on Earth (Half Note, 2009)
With Anthony Coleman
 Sephardic Tinge (Tzadik, 1995)
With Dave Douglas
 In Our Lifetime (New World, 1994)
 Stargazer (Arabesque, 1996)
 Soul on Soul (RCA, 2000)
 Freak In (RCA Bluebird, 2003)
With Mark Feldman
 Secrets (Tzadik, 2009)
With Bill Frisell
 Lookout for Hope (ECM, 1988)
 Before We Were Born (Elektra/Musician, 1989)
 Is That You? (Elektra Nonesuch, 1990)
 Where in the World? (Elektra Nonesuch, 1991)
 Have a Little Faith (Elektra Nonesuch, 1992)
 This Land (Elektra Nonesuch, 1993)
 Go West: Music for the Films of Buster Keaton (Elektra Nonesuch, 1995)
 The High Sign/One Week (Elektra Nonesuch, 1995)
 Live (Gramavision, 1995)
With Fred Frith
 Allies (RecRec, 1996)
With Richard Galliano
 Laurita (Dreyfus, 1999)
With Jim Hall
These Rooms (Denon, 1988)
 Hemispheres (ArtistShare, 2008) with Bill Frisell
 Conversations (ArtistShare, 2009)
With Fred Hersch
 Sarabande (Sunnyside, 1987)
With Haino Keiji
 An Unclear Trial: More Than This (Avant, 1998)
With Marc Johnson
 The Sound of Summer Running (Verve, 1998)
 Shades of Jade (ECM, 2005)
 Swept Away (ECM, 2012)
With Lee Konitz
Sound of Surprise (RCA Victor, 1999)
With Steve Kuhn
 Remembering Tomorrow (ECM, 1995)
 Mostly Coltrane (ECM, 2008)
 Wisteria (ECM, 2012) with Steve Swallow
With Joe Lovano
 Flights of Fancy: Trio Fascination Edition Two (Blue Note 2000)
 Sound Prints (Blue Note, 2013 [2015])
With Pat Martino
 The Return (Muse, 1987)

With Carmen McRae
 Live at Ronnie Scott's (Pye, 1977)
 At the Great American Music Hall (Blue Note, 1977)
With Gary Peacock
 Tangents (ECM, 2017)
 Now This (ECM, 2015)
With Enrico Pieranunzi
 New Lands (Timeless, 1984)
 Deep Down (Soul Note, 1986)
 Play Morricone (CAM Jazz, 2001)
 Current Conditions (CAM Jazz, 2003)
 Play Morricone 2 (CAM Jazz, 2003)
 Ballads (CAM Jazz, 2006)
 Live in Japan (CAM Jazz, 2007)
 As Never Before (CAM Jazz, 2008)
With Hank Roberts
 Black Pastels (JMT, 1988)
With Herb Robertson
 Transparency (JMT, 1985)
 X-Cerpts: Live at Willisau (JMT, 1987)
 Shades of Bud Powell (JMT, 1988)
With John Scofield
 Grace Under Pressure (Blue Note, 1992)
With Julian Siegel
 Live at the Vortex (Basho Records, 2008)
With John Taylor
 Rosslyn (ECM, 2003)
With Toots Thielemans
 Only Trust Your Heart (Concord, 1988)
 Do Not Leave Me (Stash, 1989)
With Roseanna Vitro
 The Time of My Life: Roseanna Vitro Sings the Songs of Steve Allen (Sea Breeze, 1999; recorded 1986)
With John Zorn
 The Big Gundown (Icon, 1985)
 Spy vs Spy (Elektra/Musician, 1989)
 Naked City (Elektra Nonesuch, 1989) with Naked City
 Torture Garden (Shimmy Disc, 1990) with Naked City
 Grand Guignol (Avant, 1992) with Naked City
 Heretic (Avant, 1992) with Naked City
 Leng Tch'e (Toy's Factory, 1992) with Naked City
 Radio (Avant, 1993) with Naked City
 Absinthe (Avant, 1993) with Naked City
 Masada: Alef (DIW, 1994) with Masada
 Masada: Beit (DIW, 1994) with Masada
 Masada: Gimel (DIW, 1994) with Masada
 Masada: Dalet (DIW, 1995) with Masada
 Masada: Hei (DIW, 1995) with Masada
 Masada: Vav (DIW, 1995) with Masada
 Filmworks III: 1990–1995 (Toys Factory, 1996)
 Masada: Zayin (DIW, 1996) with Masada
 Masada: Het (DIW, 1997) with Masada
 Masada: Tet (DIW, 1997) with Masada
 Masada: Yod (DIW, 1997) with Masada
 Filmworks IV: S&M + More (Tzadik, 1997)
 New Traditions in East Asian Bar Bands (Tzadik, 1997)
 The Circle Maker (Tzadik, 1997)
 Black Box (Tzadik, 1997) with Naked City
 Taboo & Exile (Tzadik, 1999)
 Live in Jerusalem 1994 (Tzadik, 1999) with Masada
 Live in Taipei 1995 (Tzadik, 1999) with Masada
 Live in Middelheim 1999 (Tzadik, 1999) with Masada
 Live in Sevilla 2000 (Tzadik, 2000)
 The Gift (Tzadik, 2001)
 Live at Tonic 2001 (Tzadik, 2001) with Masada
 Naked City Live, Vol. 1: The Knitting Factory 1989 (Tzadik, 2002) with Naked City
 First Live 1993 (Tzadik, 2002) with Masada
 50th Birthday Celebration Volume 4 (Tzadik, 2004) with Electric Masada
 50th Birthday Celebration Volume 7 (Tzadik, 2004) with Masada
 Naked City: The Complete Studio Recordings (Tzadik, 2005) with Naked City
 Electric Masada: At the Mountains of Madness (Tzadik, 2005) with Electric Masada
 50th Birthday Celebration Volume 11 (Tzadik, 2005) with Bar Kokhba Sextet
 Sanhedrin 1994–1997 (Tzadik, 2005) with Masada
 Moonchild: Songs Without Words (Tzadik, 2005) with Moonchild Trio
 Astronome (Tzadik, 2006) with Moonchild Trio
 Six Litanies for Heliogabalus (Tzadik, 2007) with Moonchild Trio
 The Crucible (Tzadik, 2008) with Moonchild Trio
 Lucifer: Book of Angels Volume 10 (Tzadik, 2008) with Bar Kokhba Sextet
 The Dreamers (Tzadik, 2008) with The Dreamers
 Stolas: Book of Angels Volume 12 (Tzadik, 2009) with Masada Quintet
 O'o (Tzadik, 2009) with The Dreamers
 Ipsissimus (Tzadik, 2010) with Moonchild
 Ipos: Book of Angels Volume 14 (Tzadik, 2010) with The Dreamers
 Nova Express (Tzadik, 2011) with the Nova Quartet
 At the Gates of Paradise (Tzadik, 2011)
 A Dreamers Christmas (Tzadik, 2011) with The Dreamers
 Templars: In Sacred Blood (Tzadik, 2012) with Moonchild
 A Vision in Blakelight (Tzadik, 2012)
 The Concealed (Tzadik, 2012)
 Dreamachines (Tzadik, 2013) with the Nova Quartet
 The Last Judgement (Tzadik, 2014) with Moonchild
 On Leaves of Grass (Tzadik, 2014) with the Nova Quartet
 Pellucidar: A Dreamers Fantabula (Tzadik, 2015) with The Dreamers
 Andras: The Book Of Angels Volume 28 (Tzadik, 2016) with Nova Express Quintet

Filmography
Step Across the Border (RecRec, 1990) with Fred Frith
Masada Live at Tonic 1999 (Tzadik, 2004) with Masada
A Bookshelf on Top of the Sky: 12 Stories About John Zorn (Tzadik, 2004) with Masada
Bill Frisell: A Portrait (Emma Franz Films, 2017)

References

External links
Drummerworld article

1955 births
Living people
American jazz drummers
Jewish American musicians
Music of Richmond, Virginia
Musicians from Richmond, Virginia
Avant-garde jazz drummers
Jewish jazz musicians
20th-century American drummers
American male drummers
Jazz musicians from Virginia
20th-century American male musicians
American male jazz musicians
Naked City (band) members
Masada (band) members
Sunnyside Records artists
DIW Records artists
Tzadik Records artists
ECM Records artists
JMT Records artists
Intakt Records artists
21st-century American Jews
ArtistShare artists
CAM Jazz artists